Michele E. Clark (June 2, 1943 — December 8, 1972) was an American journalist. She was the first African-American woman to be a television correspondent for CBS News. As a correspondent at WBBM-TV she covered the 1972 Democratic Party presidential primaries. Clark died in a plane crash in 1972, at the age of 29, while investigating the Watergate scandal. Her death has been widely described as cutting short a promising career. Michele Clark Magnet High School in Chicago is named after her.

Early life and education
Clark was born in Gary, Indiana on June 2, 1943. Her parents were Harvey Clark, Jr. and Johnetta Clark. They met while attending Fisk University, and her father served in World War II and worked as a bus driver and the manager of an appliance store. Clark had a younger brother, also named Harvey Clark, who became a reporter at WCAU. The family's decision to move into an all-white neighborhood of Cicero, Illinois sparked the Cicero race riot of 1951, of which they were the victims.

Clark attended the University of Chicago Laboratory Schools, followed by Grinnell College and Roosevelt University. She graduated from the Columbia University Graduate School of Journalism in 1972. In 1970 she graduated from the Summer Program in Journalism for Members of Minority Groups there, and that program was subsequently renamed the Michele Clark Fellowship Program for Minority Journalists. Before the start of her career as a reporter, Clark worked at United Airlines, and as a model.

Career

Clark began her journalism career at WBBM-TV, a CBS station in Chicago. She became a CBS News correspondent at a time when few women and few African Americans worked as network correspondents, and was hired at around the same time as three other women: Connie Chung, Lesley Stahl, and Sylvia Chase. Clark was the first black woman network reporter for CBS Television.

Even though she was a new reporter, Clark was assigned to cover the 1972 Democratic Party presidential primaries for CBS. This has been described as her "most prominent assignment". She was slated to become a correspondent on 60 Minutes in 1973.

Death
Clark died on December 8, 1972, at the age of 29, in the crash of United Air Lines Flight 553 at Midway Airport. At the time of her death, Clark was working on reporting related to the Watergate scandal, which was still being covered up. This has led to speculation that, if Clark had not died, she might have broken news of the Watergate scandal. Clark's presence on the flight became a feature in conspiracy theories regarding the crash of Flight 553, suggesting that the crash was related to a cover-up of Watergate.

Recognition
Clark has been identified as a "star" journalist who died at the start of a promising career. Bill Kurtis recalled that at Clark's funeral, CBS executive Richard S. Salant said that Clark's death was "as if Ed Murrow had died at a young age".

Clark is the namesake of Michele Clark Magnet High School, a high school in Chicago, Illinois. The school was originally called Austin High School when it opened in 1972, but was renamed in honor of Clark in 1974.

After Clark's death, the summer program that she attended at Columbia University was renamed the Michele Clark Fellowship Program for Minority Journalists, partly in recognition of efforts she had made to keep the program running when it had run low on funds.

Clark is also the namesake for the first fellowship of the Radio Television Digital News Association, the Michele Clark Fellowship. She has continued to be memorialized on CBS television.

References

1943 births
1972 deaths
People from Gary, Indiana
20th-century American journalists
African-American journalists
American women journalists
African-American women journalists
Journalists from Indiana
American political journalists
American television reporters and correspondents
American women television journalists
CBS News people
Grinnell College alumni
Roosevelt University alumni
Columbia University Graduate School of Journalism alumni
Victims of aviation accidents or incidents in 1972
Victims of aviation accidents or incidents in the United States